Ganpatrao Devji Tapase (30 October 1909–3 October 1992, Mumbai) was an Indian politician, an Indian independence activist and later a leader of the Indian National Congress political party in Maharashtra.

He had studied in Fergusson College and Law College Pune. He was elected to the Bombay Legislative Assembly in 1946 and 1952 from Satara district. He was a member of the Rajya Sabha from 3 April 1962 to 2 April 1968. He was the Governor of Uttar Pradesh state from 2 October 1977 to	27 February 1980  and the Governor of Haryana state from 28 February 1982 to 14 June 1984.

Works
 From Mudhouse to Rajbhavan: Autobiography of a Governor (1983)

References

1909 births
1992 deaths
People from Maharashtra
Governors of Haryana
Governors of Uttar Pradesh
Indian independence activists from Maharashtra
Rajya Sabha members from Maharashtra
Marathi politicians
People from Satara district
Bombay State politicians